The 2012 Chinese Grand Prix (formally the 2012 Formula 1 UBS Chinese Grand Prix) was a Formula One motor race held on 15 April 2012 at the Shanghai International Circuit in Shanghai, China. It was the ninth running of the Chinese Grand Prix as a round of the Formula One World Championship. The 56-lap race was the third round of the 2012 Formula One season.

The race was won by German driver Nico Rosberg driving a Mercedes, after he dominated the race to claim his debut Formula One victory and his first race win since leaving GP2 Series six years previously. Rosberg became the first German driver to win a Grand Prix driving a German car in Formula 1 history. The win was also the first win for an official Mercedes-Benz team since the 1955 Italian Grand Prix, after which Mercedes departed from Formula One for 55 seasons. Rosberg led home the McLaren pair of Jenson Button and Lewis Hamilton by over twenty seconds. The race itself was characterised by intense battling throughout the field and by high reliability with 23 of 24 starters finishing the race. This race was also HRT's thirty-ninth race start, setting the record for most Grand Prix starts without scoring a single point.

This was the first race since the 2009 Italian Grand Prix that was not won by Red Bull, McLaren or Ferrari.

Report

Background
After extended debate over the legality of the Mercedes F1 W03's "front wing F-duct" design in Australia and Malaysia, that ended with the FIA declaring the design to be legal, Red Bull Racing team principal Christian Horner stated that his team was still seeking clarification on the matter, which he expected to be resolved in Shanghai, despite having previously sought a "final ruling" in Malaysia. On the Thursday before the race, Lotus F1 filed a formal protest against the front wing design, citing Article 3.15 of the technical regulations as the grounds for their challenge. The stewards later unanimously rejected the protest and Lotus has since confirmed that they will not appeal against decision.

On the Thursday before the race, McLaren driver Lewis Hamilton was given a five-place grid penalty after the team was forced to change his car's gearbox for the race.
	
The FIA confirmed that the Drag Reduction System (DRS) zone will be unchanged from 2011, with the detection point located at Turn 12 and the activation point positioned along the back straight.

Like the Australian Grand Prix, tyre supplier Pirelli brought its white-banded medium compound tyre as the harder "prime" tyre and the yellow-banded soft compound tyre as the softer "option" tyre, whereas in 2011, the "prime" compound was the silver-banded hard compound tyre.

Qualifying
Prior to the start of Q1, Ferrari spoke with Sky Sports commentator Ted Kravitz and said "they need a miracle to get into Q3 today", highlighting just how far the team thought they were from the front runners.

Q1
The first session begun with Force India driver Paul di Resta posting the first timed lap of the session. Other drivers followed soon after; all on the harder medium 'prime' tyre. The difference between the medium and the soft compounds was predicted around 0.8 seconds per lap. Leaving their run late, eight minutes into the session both the Red Bull and Mercedes cars had yet to post timed laps. Sebastian Vettel's engineer was heard saying that the lap time he did of 1:36.9 would be good enough to make Q2, subsequently it was the 15th best time of the session. With Felipe Massa in 16th after his run on the prime tyre, he was among the first to switch to the grippier soft compound 'option' tyre. His teammate Fernando Alonso followed suit soon after. Surprisingly Jenson Button undertook a lap on the soft tyres during Q1 even though looking like comfortably progressing to Q2. At the end of the session, Jean-Éric Vergne, for the second consecutive race, failed to make Q2 and was 18th ahead of the usual eliminated cars. In fact, all the eliminated cars in Q1 were in identical positions from the Malaysian Q1 qualifying session. Caterham's Heikki Kovalainen led teammate Vitaly Petrov and Timo Glock led the Marussias, while at the rear were the HRTs of Pedro de la Rosa and Narain Karthikeyan.

Q2
For the second session, the two Saubers and Kimi Räikkönen were first to set timed laps. Romain Grosjean was late to post a lap as he made a mistake on his first attempt and pitted for a new set of option tyres. Vettel, in 6th midway through the session, was told on the radio that his current time would probably not make it into Q3. With less than 2 minutes remaining only the Mercedes (P1 and P2), Lewis Hamilton (P3) and Räikkönen (P4) remained in the pits, while everyone else scrambled to get into the top 10 for Q3.  Vettel was in 7th as the chequered flag fell, however, many cars were still on flying 'hot laps'. Sergio Pérez jumped into Q3 as did Grosjean from P17 (only needing one timed lap). In a huge shock, Vettel who was on pole for the last three consecutive Chinese Grands Prix failed to make Q3. On his final lap, he only improved his time by 0.003 of a second. It was the first time since the 2009 Brazilian Grand Prix (where he qualified 16th) that Vettel failed to make the top 10 (and hence the final Q3 session). This brought his streak of 41 consecutive qualifying sessions to make the top 10 to an end. Following Vettel in 11th was Massa in 12th (the same as Malaysia) and the two Williams cars of Pastor Maldonado and Bruno Senna who were within 0.006 seconds of each other. In 15th and 16th were the two Force India cars led by di Resta, while Australian Daniel Ricciardo was last in the session in a clearly uncompetitive Toro Rosso.

Q3
For the final session, the track was cooling down and German Nico Rosberg was told to think about that in his warm up lap. He was the first to set a timed lap early on with six minutes remaining in the session. The top speed of his car down the long back straight was only 314 km/h as he hit the 7th gear rev-limiter meaning that Mercedes cars didn't have the highest top speed but rather made up time through a better acceleration through the f-duct system as he was one of the quickest past the start/finish line speed trap. Rosberg posted a 1:35.121 which was by far the fastest time of the weekend so far. Teammate Michael Schumacher was half a second slower than Rosberg, as was Hamilton, further highlighting how good Rosberg's lap was. Schumacher on his radio was told Rosberg's lap time and in reply said "not bad". After seeing Webber more than a second off his fastest lap time, Rosberg got out of his car with just under two minutes still left in the session. After confidently leaving his Mercedes, Rosberg watched everyone else fall short of his time and claimed his first pole position of his 111-race career. Following him was Hamilton half a second off (who lined up 7th on the grid after a gearbox change incurred a 5 place grid penalty) and teammate Schumacher in 3rd. Kamui Kobayashi qualified 4th fastest in his best ever qualifying result of his Formula One career to date. His previous best qualifying result was 7th in his home race at the 2011 Japanese Grand Prix. Räikkönen, like in Malaysia, posted the 5th quickest time while Button was more than a second from Rosberg's time in 6th. Webber, in the Red Bull, was 7th while Pérez, in the second Sauber, was an impressive 8th with - like his teammate -  his best ever qualifying result in his Formula One career to date. His previous best was a 9th in the 2011 Belgian Grand Prix. Alonso, like Räikkönen, was in the same position as the Malaysia qualifying session and lined up on the grid in 9th, while Grojean in the second Lotus didn't complete a timed lap and hence was 10th. In another milestone, it was the first time that both Saubers had qualified in the top 10 since the 2009 season when team were known as BMW Sauber.

After qualifying, Jean-Éric Vergne made changes to his car before the race, leading to him starting the race in pit lane.

Race

Massa, Senna, and the two Toro Rossos started on the medium tyre while everybody else had the soft yellow banded tyre fitted for the start. The Rosberg-led Mercedes cars led as they lined up on the grid into turn 1 with relative ease, while behind them Kobayashi starting in P3 was down to 6th by the fourth corner. Button started well and took sixth ahead of Räikkönen in an almost incident-free first lap. Only minor contact was made at the first turn as Bruno Senna ran into the back of Massa's Ferrari slightly damaging his front wing in the process. Mark Webber and Fernando Alonso yet again raced side by side and passed each other three times throughout the first lap - Webber, making a poor start, was scrapping for 9th behind Alonso by lap 5. By the time the DRS was enabled (lap 3) the two leading Mercedes were more than one second ahead of their rivals and therefore out of range from DRS attack from cars behind. By lap 6, Vettel was struggling with straight line speed in 14th position and was 19th fastest through the speed trap, complaining to his engineer via radio. On lap 7, Webber made a strategic early pit stop to change to medium tyres and immediately set a fastest lap time. This prompted a flurry of pit stops by the other drivers. Hamilton and Räikkönen pitted and came out side by side. However, Hamilton had his nose in front, allowing him to rejoin ahead of Räikkönen. Mark Webber slotted in between in Hamilton and Räikkönen, leaving Räikkönen the loser during the pit stop phase.

Michael Schumacher was forced to retire after a miscommunication resulted in him leaving the pit lane before his right front wheel was properly fitted. The wheel-gun man knew he made an error and immediately tried to call Schumacher back, but it was too late. He was subsequently the only retirement of the race, leaving Mercedes to ponder what could have been at least a podium finish. On lap 14, pole sitter and leader Rosberg pitted for mediums tyres leaving an unpitted Pérez in the lead.

Following the pit stops, Nico Rosberg once again emerged as the leader, followed by Jenson Button, Lewis Hamilton, Mark Webber, and Kimi Räikkönen. Lap 21 saw everyone in their adjusted positions after everyone had completed one pit stop. On lap 22, Webber stopped for fresh medium tyres, and set a new fastest lap upon emerging. Button and Hamilton followed suit soon after. Räikkönen pitted from 2nd on lap 29, dropping him down to 13th. At this stage of the race, Jenson Button had great pace and was quickly catching the cars ahead who had only stopped once (Pérez, Vettel, Grosjean, and the leading Rosberg). On lap 30, Rob Smedley was heard telling Felipe Massa, "Fernando on a different strategy", essentially telling him to let his teammate through for 10th place at the time. Soon after Alonso moved ahead of di Resta, justifying Ferrari's radio call to Massa. At this stage it was clear that Rosberg, Vettel, and Räikkönen were on two-stop strategies while Button, Hamilton and Webber were on track for three stops. Pérez was third on lap 35, but under huge pressure from Lewis Hamilton and was locking up his front tyres heavily while defending into the hairpin, turn 14.

Rosberg, having continued running on his hard tyres for 21 laps, finally decided to pit on lap 34 for his second and final stop - meaning he would need 22 laps from this set of medium tyres. This allowed Button to take the lead, followed by Rosberg and Hamilton, who was closely pressed by Alonso for third. At this stage of the race, a 'train' of cars started to form (seen clearly down the back straight). From Massa in 5th, who had only stopped once, the next three cars all had their DRS open, meaning they were all within one second of each other and it appeared Massa was fast enough not to be overtaken, but slow enough to keep everyone bunched up behind him. Replays were shown of Mark Webber, prior to the long DRS back straight, going wide and hitting a bump to ascend both his front tyres off the ground by half a metre. Luckily, he handed the car without damaging the suspension of front wing allowing him to only lose a second of lap time.

The train continued to grow by lap 38 as Grosjean in 10th joined Massa, Räikkönen, Kobayshi, and Vettel in the battle for 5th. Jenson Button asked his engineer "what time is Rosberg doing?", to which his engineer replied "Rosberg is seven-tenths slower than us". However, this was before Rosberg pitted for new tyres, and now Rosberg was six-tenths a lap up on Button.

Lap 38 saw Hamilton pit from 3rd, closely followed in by Alonso, dropping them to 10th and 11th respectively. Button's final pit stop while 7 seconds ahead, on lap 39, was delayed due to an error on the left rear wheel and allowed Rosberg back into the lead. Following Button's pit stop, Rosberg now led Massa by 19.1 seconds in clear command and within sight of victory as highlighted by his engineer saying "most important thing is your looking after the tyres". Finally Massa pitted from second place, but he now released a Räikkönen-led train of cars. On lap 43, eleven cars could be seen from one end to the other of the long back DRS straight. Alonso went wide on turn 7 onto the discarded tyre marbles while trying to overtake Maldonado and nearly collected the Sauber of Sergio Pérez on the way back onto track. Grosjean who was a part of the train went wide in turn 7 (like Alonso) and lost grip on tyre marbles while trying to overtake Vettel, consequently losing some positions. By lap 49 Räikkönen's tyres appeared to hit the 'cliff' and lose effective tyre performance. In the space of 2 laps Räikkönen went from 2nd to 12th.

The 'train', which was started by Massa and continued by Räikkönen, led to 2nd to 14th positions being separated by just 15 seconds (rare to see so late in a race without a safety car). With 5 laps remaining, Rosberg had a 20+ second lead while Vettel, in 2nd, finally succumbed to the 3-stopped Button. Vettel, who had gone with a two-stop strategy, was now struggling like Räikkönen a few laps earlier. Hamilton and Webber were right on his rear wing now and it was only a matter of time before he dropped back. On lap 54, Hamilton took 3rd position from Vettel at the hairpin and a lap later, Mark Webber did the same for 4th.

On crossing the chequered flag, Nico Rosberg won his first ever Formula One grand prix from 111 races. He was the 103rd different winner of a Formula One grand prix since 1950, and the 12th different Mercedes powered winner in Formula One. Button finished 20 seconds adrift in 2nd after a pit stop error robbed what little chance he may have had at taking victory (although unlikely given Rosberg's pace and the difficulty seen when overtaking on this track). Locking out an all Mercedes-powered podium was Hamilton, followed by Red Bull's Mark Webber in 4th. Both Hamilton and Webber have now finished 3rd and 4th respectively for all of the three grands prix this season. Webber's Red Bull teammate, Sebastian Vettel, finished 5th on worn tyres and Romain Grosjean finished 6th in his best ever result in a Formula One race. The Williams cars showed good race pace and earned solid points with Senna in 7th and Maldonado in 8th. Ferrari continued their struggle in dry conditions, with Alonso finishing 9th and teammate Massa in 13th. Kamui Kobayashi took the final point in 10th ahead of teammate Pérez in a disappointing grand prix for the Sauber team after having such a great qualifying performance. Of note was 2007 world champion Kimi Räikkönen who finished a disappointing 14th after his tyres were too worn. Also, of note was the fact that 17 drivers completed the race on the lead lap, with Daniel Ricciardo in 17th just over one minute behind the leader in a highly uncompetitive Toro Rosso (teammate Vergne was 16th).  This race was the first win for the Brackley-based Mercedes GP team since the 2009 Italian Grand Prix when Rubens Barrichello won when the team was known as Brawn GP.

Support events
The event took place between 12 and 15 April where throughout the weekend there were support events. Taking part in the Chinese Grand Prix program was the Porsche Carrera Cup Asia with 2 races.

Classification

Qualifying

Notes
 — Lewis Hamilton was given a five-place grid penalty for a gearbox change prior to the weekend.
 — Jean Eric Vergne started from pit lane after his team carried out various changes to his car, contravening parc ferme regulations.

Race

Championship standings after the race

Drivers' Championship standings

Constructors' Championship standings

 Note: Only the top five positions are included for both sets of standings.

References

External links 

Chinese Grand Prix
China
Grand Prix China
Chinese Grand Prix